Joseph Alfred Xavier Michiels (December 25, 1813 - October 28, 1892) was a French historian and writer on art and literature.

Biography
He was born in Rome of Dutch-Burgundian parents. He began his law studies at Strassburg (1834), but made his home in Paris.

Works
 Études sur l'Allemagne (Studies of Germany, 1830)
 Histoire des idées littéraires en France au XIXe siècle et de leur origines dans les siècles antérieurs (History of 19th-century literary ideas in France and their origins in previous centuries, 1842)
 Angleterre (England, 1844), of which a fourth edition (1872) was called Voyage d'un amateur: Histoire de la peinture flamande et hollandaise (1845, new ed., enl., 1865–76), and its sequel, L'art flamand dans l'est et le midi de la France (1877)
 L'architecture et la peinture en Europe depuis le IVe au XVIe siècle (Architecture and painting in Europe from the 4th to the 16th centuries, 3d ed. 1873)
 Rubens et l'école d'Anvers (Rubens and the school of Anvers, 4th ed. 1877)
 Histoire secrète du gouvernement autrichien (Secret history of the Austrian government, 4th ed. 1879)
 Le comte de Bismarck (Count Bismarck, 1871)
 Histoire de la guerre franco-prussienne (History of the Franco Prussian War, 1872)
 Van Dyck et ses éleves (Van Dyck and his students, 1880)
 Le monde du comique et du rire (The world of humor and laughing, 1887)

References
 

1813 births
1892 deaths
19th-century French historians
French art historians
Writers from Paris
Italian writers in French